The Baseball World Cup was an international tournament where national baseball teams from around the world competed. It was sanctioned by the International Baseball Federation (IBAF). Along with the World Baseball Classic, it was one of two active tournaments considered by the IBAF to be a major world championship. The baseball tournament at the Summer Olympic Games was also considered a major world championship while baseball was an Olympic sport.

After the 2011 tournament, the Baseball World Cup was discontinued in favor of an expanded World Baseball Classic tournament. The World Baseball Softball Confederation (WBSC) – successor to the IBAF – now sanctions two new tournaments: the biennial 23U Baseball World Cup (begun as the 21U Baseball World Cup in 2014) and WBSC's quadrennial, flagship tournament – involving the twelve best-ranked national teams in the world – called the WBSC Premier12 (starting in 2015).

History
The Baseball World Cup was held 38 times; the final one was in 2011 in Panama. The first tournament, held in 1938, featured only two teams, but the last tournament included 22 participants; the previous two featured 16 and 18 teams (in 2007 and 2005, respectively). The World Cup was originally called the Amateur World Series, until the tournament in 1988. Until 1988, the Amateur World Series was held in intervals of one to four years, except for the eight-year period from 1953 to 1961. From 1988 to 2001, the Baseball World Cup was held in intervals of two to four years. After 2001, the tournament was held every two years.

Until 1998 the competition was limited to amateur players. After 1998, professional minor league players competed, but Major League Baseball did not allow its players to participate. In the months leading up to the high-profile first World Baseball Classic in 2006, many commentators heralded it as a "Baseball World Cup", perhaps not realizing that a tournament of that description already existed and had for almost seventy years. However, the 2006 World Baseball Classic was the first international baseball tournament to include players from the major leagues, making it a closer equivalent to the world cups of other sports—which include players from the most prestigious professional leagues—than to the Baseball World Cup.

Tournament results

Medal table

See also

Women's Baseball World Cup
Baseball awards#World
Baseball at the Summer Olympics
Intercontinental Cup (International Baseball Federation (IBAF))
WBSC Premier12
World Baseball Classic

References

External links

2009 Baseball World Cup

 
Cup
Recurring sporting events established in 1938
Recurring sporting events disestablished in 2011
World Baseball Softball Confederation competitions